Sheree Corniel (born 19 August 1969) is a Puerto Rican softball player. She competed in the women's tournament at the 1996 Summer Olympics, as well as in the 1995 Pan American Games.

In 1987, she played softball for University of Nevada, Las Vegas on an athletic scholarship. In 1995, she won a silver medal at the Pan American Games. Following her retirement, she worked as a probation officer in Las Vegas.

References

1969 births
Living people
Puerto Rican softball players
Olympic softball players of Puerto Rico
Softball players at the 1996 Summer Olympics
Place of birth missing (living people)
20th-century Puerto Rican women